Serj (Armenian: Սերժ) is an Armenian and Breton given name. Serzh is an alternative Armenian form. Notable people with the name include:

Serzh Sargsyan (born 1954), Armenian politician, former president of Armenia
Serj Tankian (born 1967), Armenian-American musician, poet, and political activist

See also
Serge (name)
Sargis

Armenian masculine given names
Breton masculine given names